Park Ji-sung (born 30 March 1981) is a South Korean former professional footballer who played as a midfielder. Born in the South Korean capital Seoul, Park is one of the most successful Asian players in football history, having won 19 trophies in his career. He is the first Asian footballer to have won the UEFA Champions League, to play in a UEFA Champions League final, as well as the first Asian to have won the FIFA Club World Cup. Park was able to play anywhere across the midfield and was noted for his exceptional fitness level, discipline, work ethic and off-the-ball movement. His remarkable endurance levels earned him the nickname "Three-Lung" Park.

Park began his football career in his native South Korea and played for the Myongji University team before moving to Japan to play for Kyoto Purple Sanga. After Park's national team manager Guus Hiddink moved back to the Netherlands to manage PSV Eindhoven, Park followed him to the Dutch side a year later. After PSV reached the semi-finals of the 2004–05 UEFA Champions League, Park's talents were recognised by Manchester United manager Sir Alex Ferguson and he signed Park for a fee of around £4 million in July 2005. In his time at United, his honours included four Premier League titles, the 2007–08 UEFA Champions League, and the 2008 FIFA Club World Cup. He moved to Queens Park Rangers in July 2012 after suffering a reduction in his number of appearances for Manchester United the previous season. However, an injury-interrupted season with QPR, combined with the club's relegation, led to Park rejoining PSV on loan for the 2013–14 season.

As a member of the South Korea national team, Park won 100 caps and scored 13 goals. He was a member of the team that finished fourth at the 2002 FIFA World Cup, and also represented his nation at the 2006 FIFA World Cup and the 2010 FIFA World Cup. At the World Cup, he was named man of the match four times, the most of any Asian player, and is currently South Korea's joint all-time leading World Cup goalscorer with three goals alongside Ahn Jung-hwan and Son Heung-min, having scored in three consecutive tournaments.

Early life
Park was born in Seoul, but his family registered his birth in Goheung, Jeonnam, which is his father's hometown. He then left for Suwon, a satellite city of Seoul, and spent his adolescence there. He began playing football during his fourth year of elementary school. He attended Anyong Middle School and Suwon Technical High School. While at school, Park attracted attention as one of the most promising young talents in South Korea and was scouted by a number of clubs. He was well known for his excellent work rate, mesmerising dribbling and accurate passes. However, his small physique became a weak point after he entered middle school. His father, Park Sung-jong, quit his job and started a butcher shop for his son's dream. Sung-jong not only fed Park different meats but also frogs, antlers and deer blood, in the belief that it would increase his physical abilities. While in high school, Park helped his high school team's win at high school competition of the Korean National Sports Festival in 1998, though he was at that point rejected by a number of professional clubs and universities due to his small stature. He ended up playing for Myongji University after Lee Hak-jong, his high school coach, strongly recommended him to Kim Hee-tae, the university coach. Park was attached to the university's tennis club at that time, because the football club was full, so Kim asked the tennis coach for help.

From the winter holiday of his secondary school year, Park began to train with his university team as a prospective member. A few weeks later, in January 1999, his university team was given the chance to train with the South Korea Olympic team. After a splendid performance, he attracted the attention of Huh Jung-moo, the coach of the South Korea national team and Olympic team. Thereafter he became a preliminary member of the Olympic team, and finally a formal member of its squad. At 18 years old, it was believed that if Park had not been selected for the Olympic team, he would have been selected for the under-20 team instead. This selection was so unexpected for Park and others that it was rumoured that Huh selected Park to fulfil a bet after losing to Kim Hee-tae in a game of Go.

On 5 April 2000, in a 2000 AFC Asian Cup qualification match against Laos, Park made his debut as a member of the national team, along with Lee Chun-soo. In June 2000, while he was a national team member and a second year student at Myongji University, Kyoto Purple Sanga of Japan offered Park a contract and he took the offer though he was still a relative unknown. Park was the first instance of a relatively unknown Korean player being offered a contract by a Japanese club.

In September 2000, at the 2000 Summer Olympics, his Olympic team failed to advance to the knockout stage, and the South Korea national football team replaced head coach Huh Jung-moo with Guus Hiddink.

Club career

Kyoto Purple Sanga
In June 2000, Park signed with the Kyoto-based then J1 League side Kyoto Purple Sanga. In the spring of 2000, hearing that there was a rising star in Korea, Bunji Kimura, Sanga's coach at the time, visited Korea along with other scouts. In a practice game, the rising star did not attract their attention, whereas Park did. In an interview, Kimura said:

In a practice match, a player arrested our eyes. Despite his injuries, Park's performance was outstanding. Park played only about 20 minutes, however we could see his sense, physical strength, and his potential, so we accepted Park instead of the player we thought. This scout aroused a lot of criticism in Sanga because Park was unknown, to the point that I should resign.

In 2001, the club won the J2 League title and were promoted to the J1 League. In 2002, Park led the team to the final of the Emperor's Cup, and in the final on 1 January 2003, he scored the equaliser with a header. The team went on to win the match 2–1 to become the Emperor's Cup champions for the first time in Sanga's history. This was Park's last game for Sanga. In January 2003, he left Sanga as Guus Hiddink invited him to play for PSV Eindhoven.

PSV Eindhoven
After the World Cup, Hiddink was appointed as manager of Dutch club PSV Eindhoven. In 2003, Park and South Korean teammate Lee Young-pyo moved to PSV in order to play under their mentor and former national team coach. While Lee quickly became a fixture in PSV's starting line-up, Park struggled due to injuries. He had an operation to remove his meniscus after the injury and this affected his ability. He felt fear when the ball came to him because he was jeered at by PSV fans disappointed at his performance.

By the end of 2003–04 season, however, Park had begun to adapt to the Netherlands, both on and off the field. In the 2004–05 season, the departure of Arjen Robben to Chelsea afforded Park more starting opportunities and he quickly proved his worth to the team. Along with Johann Vogel, DaMarcus Beasley and Dutchmen Mark van Bommel and Philip Cocu, Park formed the backbone of PSV's midfield play with his pace and passing. Having been a top contributor of goals and assists that season, the highlight of Park's PSV career came when he scored the first goal against Italian team Milan in the UEFA Champions League semi-finals. PSV went on to win the home leg 3–1, but their 2–0 loss during the away leg meant Milan advanced to the final.

Nevertheless, thanks to these strong performances, Park was chosen, along with Andriy Shevchenko, Adriano, Samuel Eto'o and Ronaldinho, as one of the nominees for the 2005 UEFA Best Forward award. PSV fans were so enamoured with Park that they wrote a song about him entitled "Song for Park", which was included on the official PSV album PSV Kampioen.

Manchester United

2005–06 season
In July 2005, Park chose to join Sir Alex Ferguson's Manchester United. Park signed for the Premier League side for £4 million, subject to a medical and work permit. He became the second East Asian player to sign for Manchester United, after Dong Fangzhuo.

On 1 October 2005, Park largely contributed to a 3–2 victory against Fulham by assisting two goals and winning a penalty kick. On 18 October 2005, Park became the first Asian to ever captain Manchester United when he took the armband from Ryan Giggs as he replaced him during a Champions League home group match against Lille. Park's first goal for Manchester United came on 20 December 2005, during a 3–1 win over Birmingham City in the League Cup fifth round. On 5 February 2006, Park appeared to have scored his first Premier League goal, against Fulham in United's 4–2 victory at Old Trafford. The Premier League's Dubious Goals Panel, however, later ruled that this was an own goal due to a deflection off the Fulham defender Carlos Bocanegra. On 9 April 2006, Park scored his first official league goal, netting the second of a 2–0 home win over Arsenal.

2006–07 season
Park injured his ankle during the match against Tottenham Hotspur on 9 September 2006 and returned to the field after three months. On 17 March 2007, he scored two goals against Bolton Wanderers, the first time he had scored more than once in a Premier League match. In April 2007, Park was sent to America for surgery on a recurring knee injury, putting an end to his season. Although sidelined by injury for most of the season, he recorded five goals and two assists in 14 appearances, and satisfied enough matches for a Premier League medal. However, Park started suffering chronic knee problems which eventually accelerated his retirement.

2007–08 season
On 1 March 2008, Park scored his first league goal of the 2007–08 season after returning from his long-term injury against Fulham. His lack of appearances had caused much controversy in South Korea, but he proved his worth when he delivered an assist to Wayne Rooney in the Champions League quarter-final match against Roma. On 29 April 2008, Manchester United advanced to the Champions League Final after beating Barcelona. Park, however, was excluded from the squad to face Chelsea in the final despite starting both legs of the semi-final; manager Sir Alex Ferguson later stated that leaving him out was one of the hardest decisions he had had to make throughout his managerial career.

2008–09 season

Early in the 2008–09 Premier League season, in an away match versus Chelsea, Park scored the only goal for United in a 1–1 draw on 21 September 2008, in a game which he also won the man of the match award. On 13 December 2008, he made his 100th appearance for Manchester United, starting in the match against Tottenham Hotspur at White Hart Lane, the game ended 0–0. Park was included in the 23-man squad for the FIFA Club World Cup held at the end of 2008. He missed the semi-final but played the full 90 minutes in the final which they won 1–0 becoming the first English side to win the competition. On 7 March 2009, Park scored his first FA Cup goal in the 4–0 quarter-final win over Fulham at Craven Cottage, he latched onto a misplaced pass by Zoltán Gera eventually slotting it into the far corner for the fourth and final goal. On 15 April 2009, Manchester United advanced to semi-finals of the Champions League by defeating Porto 3–2 on aggregate. This made Park the only Asian player to be part of Champions League semi-finals on four occasions.

On 2 May 2009, Park verbally agreed to a new four-year £50,000-a-week deal at Manchester United, stating, "I have no reason to move. I play at the best club in the world." Following this announcement, Park scored his second league goal of the season – and third overall – in a 2–0 away win against Middlesbrough. On 5 May 2009, Park scored his first Champions League goal for Manchester United in the second leg of the semi-final against Arsenal at the Emirates. He pounced on a slip by Kieran Gibbs and placed the ball over Manuel Almunia in the eighth minute, with the game ending 3–1 (4–1 on aggregate), advancing United to the Champions League final for the second year running. Park became the first Asian player in history to play in a Champions League final, although his team lost 2–0 to Barcelona.

2009–10 season
On 14 September 2009, Park signed a three-year contract extension with United, keeping him at the club until 2012. Ferguson said during the summer that he was always confident a deal would be done with Park, whose wages were estimated to be about £75,000 a week. Park started the 2009–10 season poorly. He had to be absent again for a long period after the international match against Senegal, because a long flight filled his knee with water in October 2009.

On 31 January 2010, Park scored his first goal of the 2009–10 season, hitting United's third in a 3–1 win against Arsenal. His last goal also came against Arsenal at the Emirates in the same scoreline, coming in the 2008–09 Champions League, this was also the first time United had beaten Arsenal at the Emirates in the Premier League. On 10 March 2010, Park scored his first European goal of the season which was also his first for United in Europe at Old Trafford, hitting the third in a 4–0 win over Milan. This was also his second goal against Milan in the Champions League. On 21 March 2010, Park scored a crucial winner in the derby against Liverpool, turning in Darren Fletcher's right-wing cross with a diving header. On 4 May 2010, Park committed himself to United by openly claiming he would like to spend the rest of career with them, saying, "There is no reason to move to any other team." On 9 May 2010, Park netted on the final day of the season, scoring a close-range diving header against Stoke City to wrap up a 4–0 win.

2010–11 season

Park returned to the United team for the first time following the World Cup as he started against a League of Ireland XI in their final pre-season game on 4 August 2010. He marked this game with the first ever goal scored at the newly built Aviva Stadium, he then scored a second later on as United ended the game 7–1 winners.

On 22 September 2010, Park netted his first goal of the 2010–11 season as he scored United's fourth of a 5–2 away win against Scunthorpe United in the third round of the League Cup. He then netted in the next round of the League Cup, scoring United's second goal in a 3–2 home win over Wolverhampton Wanderers on 26 October 2010. Park scored his first two league goals of the season in a 2–1 home win over Wolves on 6 November, the second a late winner in the 93rd minute. On 27 November, Park scored United's second goal in a 7–1 home victory over Blackburn Rovers. Park's performance's during November 2010 helped him gain the Player of the Month award from the club's website. Park was then voted as United Player of the Month for December 2010, grabbing the award for the second month in a row. On 13 December, Park netted the only goal of the match against Arsenal, a looping header, his fourth goal in seven starts against them.

Park jetted off to captain South Korea in the 2011 AFC Asian Cup and missed seven games for United after the turn of the year. Upon his return from the subsequent tournament, he was ruled out for one month due to an hamstring injury which occurred during training. He returned to action for the first time since Boxing Day on 2 April, playing 64 minutes of a 4–2 away win over West Ham United. On 12 April 2011, Park scored his first goal since the turn of the year when he scored the winning goal in the Champions League quarter-final second leg tie against Chelsea, ending in a 2–1 win. On 8 May, Park assisted Javier Hernández's opening goal with an accurate through-ball just 36 seconds after the start of the crucial match, which virtually decided United's league title with a 2–1 victory over rivals Chelsea. On 22 May, he scored a goal and set up the second goal for Anderson in the last match of the season against Blackpool. Park played in another Champions League final, against Barcelona in 2011, which United lost 3–1.

2011–12 season
During the United States tour, Park scored in a 4–1 win against the New England Revolution and in a 7–0 win against Seattle Sounders FC. In the MLS All-Star Game, which Manchester United won 4–0, Park was named the man of the match after scoring a goal on the stroke of half-time.

On 28 August 2011, Park scored the sixth goal in an 8–2 home win against Arsenal, shortly after coming on as a second-half substitute. Park made his first start of the season in the Premier League in a 2–0 home win against Norwich City. Late on in the game he was involved in a neat one-two with Danny Welbeck in the creation of United's second goal of the day, which Welbeck finished. On 26 December 2011, Park scored an early goal in United's 5–0 home win against Wigan Athletic with a neat, side-foot finish from Patrice Evra's cutback. He also won the penalty that wrapped up the win which Dimitar Berbatov scored to complete his hat-trick. In an FA Cup fourth round clash against Liverpool, Park scored an equalising goal with a low finish from a Rafael cross to make it 1–1; however, United went on to lose the tie.

On 5 February 2012, Park made his 200th appearance for Manchester United by coming on as a substitute in the 86th minute against Chelsea. He became the 92nd player in the history of the club to reach the milestone. On 23 February 2012, Park captained Manchester United for the first time from the beginning of a match in a 2–1 home defeat to Ajax in the UEFA Europa League. Although the match ended in a defeat, United still advanced to the round of 16 with a 3–2 aggregate score. On 30 April 2012, Park played in the Manchester derby, in a game that was widely perceived as crucial to Manchester United's title defence. Park absented seven consecutive games by lagging behind in his positional competition at that time, but Ferguson trusted Park's big game ability. However, Park's performance was lethargic and he was criticized by the press. Manchester United lost the game 1–0 and Manchester City went on to win the Premier League title.

Queens Park Rangers
Having received less first-team football in his last season at Manchester United, Park moved to Queens Park Rangers for an undisclosed fee on 9 July 2012, signing a two-year contract with the Hoops. He made his debut in a 5–0 defeat at home to Swansea City on the opening day of the season on 18 August 2012.

Park's first season with QPR was largely unsuccessful. Despite initially being made club captain, a combination of injuries and lack of form meant that Park was unable to have the kind of impact that was expected after his signing from Manchester United. Park finished the season with only 20 Premier League appearances and no goals, as QPR were relegated from the top flight of English football.

Return to PSV and retirement
With QPR no longer in the top flight, Park rejoined PSV on loan for the 2013–14 season. The deal was completed on 8 August 2013, but Park's work permit application delayed his first game back for the club. He scored his first goal against Heracles Almelo at 86 minutes to tie the game on 24 August, his second match with PSV after his return. On 22 September 2013, Park led a 4–0 victory of team against Ajax with one goal and two assists.

On 14 May 2014, shortly after the conclusion of the season, Park announced his retirement, citing issues with his knee. Reflecting on his career, he said, "I'm leaving with no regrets, I enjoyed playing football. I have achieved more than I thought I would. I'm truly grateful for all the support I have received and I will live the rest of my life thinking how I can pay it back."

International career

Early career
Park began his international career for the South Korea under-23 team as an 18-year-old defensive midfielder, selected by the manager Huh Jung-moo. On 27 May 1999, he made his debut against Chinese Taipei in the regional qualifier of 2000 Summer Olympics. On 5 April 2000, Park also made his senior international debut against Laos in the 2000 AFC Asian Cup qualification. In September 2000, Park appeared all three matches in the group stage of 2000 Summer Olympics, and South Korea was eliminated by goal difference despite two victories in the group. In October 2000, Park played five matches at the 2000 AFC Asian Cup, where South Korea finished third.

2002 World Cup
When Guus Hiddink became the head coach of South Korea, Park's position was shifted to that of a winger; since then, he has become a versatile player able to play in a variety of positions: central, right and left midfield, as well as wing-forward. Park showed his good condition by scoring against England and France in the friendly matches prior to the 2002 FIFA World Cup. Park scored a memorable goal during the 2002 FIFA World Cup. During the group stages South Korea had won their first game against Poland and drew against the United States. In order to advance, they had to manage a draw at the least against favoured Portugal side, which included Luís Figo and Rui Costa. The game was 0–0 until the 70th minute following two red cards against Portugal, when Park scored the match winner, controlling the ball with his chest and beating Sérgio Conceição before volleying it through the legs of Portugal goalkeeper Vítor Baía and into the net with his left foot. His goal eliminated Portugal and advanced South Korea into the knockout stages of the tournament for the first time. South Korea eventually made it to the semi-finals with victories over Italy and Spain, becoming the first Asian team to do so in the history of the FIFA World Cup. Park scored the second penalty in the quarter-final shoot-out against Spain, which South Korea won 5–3.

2006 World Cup
Park was selected for the South Korea under-23 squad for the 2002 Asian Games and won a bronze medal. Park also played for South Korea in the 2004 AFC Asian Cup during July. In the quarter-final, Park assisted the Seol Ki-hyeon's goal, but South Korea lost 4–3 against Iran.

Park participated in the 2006 FIFA World Cup. Park drew a crucial free kick that led to a red card for Jean-Paul Abalo, and Lee Chun-soo finished the chance with the equalising goal in the first Group G match, a 2–1 win over Togo. Park scored the equalising goal in the second Group G match against eventual finalists France and was voted man of the match. However, South Korea lost 2–0 against Switzerland in the last group match and failed to advance into the knockout stage.

2010 World Cup
On 11 October 2008, Park captained South Korea for the first time in a friendly, which Korea won 3–0 against Uzbekistan. He was the skipper for the remainder of the qualification campaign for the 2010 FIFA World Cup and was South Korea's top scorer with five goals. One of his goals was against Iran in Seoul, beating two defenders then scored with his left foot. South Korea advanced to the finals without a single defeat. On 24 May 2010, Park scored the winning goal with a solo effort in the rivalry held in Japan just before the World Cup.

On 12 June 2010, Park netted in his third consecutive World Cup, scoring the second goal in South Korea's 2–0 win over Greece in their first group match, and celebrated the goal with a double windmill (swinging both arms round and round). He became the first Asian to score in three consecutive World Cup finals and became Asia's joint all-time leading scorer in the World Cup with three goals, alongside compatriots Ahn Jung-hwan and Son Heung-min, as well as Sami Al-Jaber of Saudi Arabia. On 22 June 2010, South Korea drew 2–2 with Nigeria and Park won the man of the match award which is his fourth in the World Cup. South Korea successfully advanced to the knockout stage in the World Cup held in a foreign country for the first time, but lost 2–1 against Uruguay in the round of 16.

2011 Asian Cup
Park's father, Park Sung-jong, said his son has planned to end his national team career after the 2011 AFC Asian Cup tournament in Qatar. Park travelled to the tournament on 26 December 2010 as squad captain. Park made his 100th international appearance in the semi-final match against Japan on 25 January 2011. Park induced a penalty kick which was finished as the opening goal but the match would not end in victory as they lost 3–0 during the penalty shoot-out following 2–2 after extra time. South Korea coach Cho Kwang-rae confirmed on 28 January that Park had retired from international duty as he was left out of their 3–2 third place play-off victory over Uzbekistan. Park was nominated as the tournament's Most Valuable Player alongside Mark Schwarzer, Keisuke Honda and Server Djeparov. The award was eventually won by Japan midfielder Honda. On 31 January, Park confirmed his retirement from international football to make way for younger players with potential.

In January 2014, the national team manager Hong Myung-bo wanted Park's return to the team for the 2014 FIFA World Cup, but Park rejected Hong's suggestion because his knee was suffering to such an extent that he had to retire. Hong went to the Netherlands to persuade Park, but accepted Park's refusal after checking the condition of Park's knee.

Style of play
Park received much acclaim at Manchester United for his speed, off-the-ball movement, work rate and energy, which saw him deployed all over the midfield, including in the middle of the pitch, in a holding role, in a box-to-box role or on either wing, where he operated as a defensive winger, incessantly pressing the opponent players. He was also capable of playing as an attacking midfielder, or even in a more advanced role as a second striker on occasion. Moreover, Park was known as a big game player, as he was often used by Sir Alex Ferguson in big league games or European games where there was an extra emphasis on defensive work. Ferguson once claimed that Park was one of the few players in the world capable of marking Lionel Messi.

In his 2013 autobiography, I Think, Therefore I Play, Italian midfielder Andrea Pirlo wrote that Park, who was deployed to man-mark him in matches for both PSV and Manchester United in the Champions League, was the one player that he could not get the better of. Pirlo wrote of Park, "The midfielder must have been the first nuclear-powered South Korean in history, in the sense that he rushed about the pitch at the speed of an electron."

In May 2020, former teammate Wayne Rooney said that Park was as important to the Manchester United side of 2006–2009 as he and Cristiano Ronaldo were, commenting: "It's crazy but if you mentioned Cristiano Ronaldo to a 12-year-old, they would immediately say, 'Yeah, he was a brilliant player for Manchester United.' But if you said 'Ji-sung Park' they may not know who he was. Yet all of us who played with Park know he was almost as important to our success. That's because of what Park gave to the collective and I want to talk about teams. They – not stars – are the most important thing in sport. People say our United team had all these great players. In reality our biggest strength was as a pure counterattacking machine. We would sit back in our shape, win the ball and just go. Park or Fletch [Darren Fletcher] – or both – were always involved. They were vital to us. Players like me, Ronaldo, Tevez got the headlines but they [Park and Fletcher] were as important as us if not more, because of what they did for the team. We knew that inside the dressing room — and also that because they were so good at sacrificing themselves, their actual individual quality was often overlooked."

In a promotional video for the Amazon Prime documentary Sir Alex Ferguson: Never Give In (2021), Ferguson said that not substituting Park on at half-time of the 2011 Champions League final against Barcelona was "a mistake" and that, had he put Park in specifically to man-mark Lionel Messi, he believed they would have won that game.

After retirement
On 25 July 2014, Park participated in the K League All-Star Game, and was named the Most Valuable Player with a goal.

On 5 October 2014, it was announced that Park was to take up a role as a global ambassador for Manchester United.

In 2016, Park was selected to participate in the 17th edition of The FIFA Master - International Master in Management, Law and Humanities of Sport with a view to furthering his ambition of working in sports administration. He graduated from the course in July 2017.

In June 2018, he became a football commentator of a South Korean broadcasting company SBS, and commented on South Korean games at the 2018 FIFA World Cup.

On 19 January 2021, he joined a K League 1 club Jeonbuk Hyundai Motors as the advisor to help the selection, nurture, scouting, and training system of players. At a similar time, he announced his resignation as United's ambassador.

In December 2021, Park rejoined Queens Park Rangers, coaching the under-16s under the guidance of the technical director Chris Ramsey.

Personal life

Family and relationships
Park largely kept his personal life out of the spotlight and surprised the media by announcing his upcoming wedding to former television reporter Kim Min-ji at his retirement press conference. They married on 27 July 2014 in South Korea, and currently have a daughter and a son. Park is a Buddhist.

Park has identified Brazilian former holding midfielder Dunga as his football idol in his early years.

Park's mother Jang Myung-ja and grandmother Kim Mae-shim both passed away on the same day of January 12,2018.

Charity works
Park is the founder of the charitable foundation, JS Foundation, set up in 2011, which develop and launch charity programs that will support football infrastructure and also the necessaries of life.

He has participated in the Asian Dream Cup annual charity event with a team entitled "Park Ji-Sung and Friends". Fellow professionals who have played with him at the event include fellow South Korean internationals Ahn Jung-hwan and Lee Chung-yong, North Korean international Jong Tae-se and United teammate and former England captain Rio Ferdinand, while celebrities who have also done so include current cast members and alumni of the popular SBS variety show Running Man, including actor Song Joong-ki, singer Kim Jong-kook and rapper Gary. As a result, Park's involvement in the 2012 edition marked his first appearance on the show over three episodes.

Controversial chant
During his time with Manchester United, the chant for Park, "Park, Park wherever you may be," included the controversial lyrics generalizing and disparaging Koreans about eating dogs, which was deemed racist. Park, who originally did not know the chant's meaning, still later he accepted the chant since it meant no harm. The chant, however, was later used on other South Korean players Ji So-yun and Hwang Hee-chan by Manchester United fans even after Park's retirement. When he participated in the anti-racism campaign of a South Korean YouTube channel in 2020, the South Korean fans criticized Park for tolerating and allowing the racist chant to be used continuously on other South Korean players. Park accepted the criticism and appealed to the United fans to stop singing his chant on behalf of Korean players and fans.

Career statistics

Club

International

Honours
Kyoto Purple Sanga
J2 League: 2001
Emperor's Cup: 2002

PSV Eindhoven
Eredivisie: 2002–03, 2004–05
KNVB Cup: 2004–05
Johan Cruyff Shield: 2003

Manchester United
Premier League: 2006–07, 2007–08, 2008–09, 2010–11
Football League Cup: 2005–06, 2008–09, 2009–10
FA Community Shield: 2010, 2011
UEFA Champions League: 2007–08
FIFA Club World Cup: 2008

South Korea U23
Asian Games bronze medal: 2002

South Korea
FIFA World Cup fourth place: 2002
AFC Asian Cup third place: 2000, 2011

Individual
AFC Asian Cup Quality Player: 2011
AFC Greatest Player of All Time (FIFA World Cup): 2020
AFC Opta Best XI of All Time (FIFA World Cup): 2020
IFFHS Asian Men's Team of All Time: 2021
Korean FA Goal of the Year: 2002, 2010
Korean FA Player of the Year: 2010
MLS All-Star Game Most Valuable Player: 2011
K League All-Star Game Most Valuable Player: 2014

See also
 List of men's footballers with 100 or more international caps

Notes

References

Further reading

External links

 Park Ji-Sung – National Team Stats at KFA 
 
 
 Park Ji-Sung at Voetbal International 
 
 European Cup / UEFA Champions League Winning Squads RSSSF

1981 births
Living people
People from Goheung County
People from Suwon
Sportspeople from South Jeolla Province
Sportspeople from Gyeonggi Province
South Korean Buddhists
South Korean footballers
Association football midfielders
Association football utility players
Myongji University alumni
Kyoto Sanga FC players
PSV Eindhoven players
Manchester United F.C. players
Queens Park Rangers F.C. players
J1 League players
J2 League players
Eredivisie players
Premier League players
UEFA Champions League winning players
South Korea under-20 international footballers
South Korea under-23 international footballers
Olympic footballers of South Korea
South Korea international footballers
2000 AFC Asian Cup players
Footballers at the 2000 Summer Olympics
2001 FIFA Confederations Cup players
Footballers at the 2002 Asian Games
2002 CONCACAF Gold Cup players
2002 FIFA World Cup players
2004 AFC Asian Cup players
2006 FIFA World Cup players
2010 FIFA World Cup players
2011 AFC Asian Cup players
Asian Games medalists in football
Asian Games bronze medalists for South Korea
Medalists at the 2002 Asian Games
FIFA Century Club
South Korean expatriate footballers
South Korean expatriate sportspeople in Japan
South Korean expatriate sportspeople in the Netherlands
South Korean expatriate sportspeople in England
Expatriate footballers in Japan
Expatriate footballers in the Netherlands
Expatriate footballers in England
South Korean football executives
FIFA Master alumni